Jiří (George) Štancl (born 19 August 1975 in Prague, Czechoslovakia, now Czech Republic) is a former international speedway rider.

Štancl's father Jiří is a former World Championship finalist and his grandfather, also called Jiří was a former rider.

References 

1975 births
Living people
Czech speedway riders
Coventry Bees riders
Newcastle Diamonds riders
Glasgow Tigers riders
Edinburgh Monarchs riders
Ipswich Witches riders
Sheffield Tigers riders
Wolverhampton Wolves riders
Sportspeople from Prague